Martha George (April 28, 1892 – January 7, 1987) was repeatedly elected chairperson of the Suquamish tribe, serving from the late 1920s to the early 1940s. She was a descendant of Chief Seattle in present-day Washington state. She founded the Small Tribes Organization of Western Washington.

George was a famous basketweaver, who taught master weaver Peg Deam.
Deam recounted a story of when she was a little girl and asked George to take her to gather bark for a cedar dress. George laughed - winter is not the time for gathering - and took her in the spring.
Her collection of Salish baskets is displayed in the Suquamish Museum.

Quote 
"They took what they needed and that's all. There's nothing wasted. That's quite important among the Indians: that you should respect the earth."—Martha George, in the video documentary Come Forth Laughing

References

1892 births
1987 deaths
Female Native American leaders
People from King County, Washington
Native American women in politics
20th-century American women
20th-century Native American women
20th-century Native Americans